Allobates mandelorum (common name: Mount Turumiquire rocket frog) is a species of frog in the family Aromobatidae. It is endemic to the Cerro Turumiquire (also spelled Cerro Turimiquire) area in eastern Venezuela. Its natural habitats are cloud forest and subpáramo shrubland. It is threatened by habitat loss.

References

mandelorum
Amphibians of Venezuela
Endemic fauna of Venezuela
Taxa named by Karl Patterson Schmidt
Amphibians described in 1932
Taxonomy articles created by Polbot